Bulk can refer to:

Industry
 Bulk cargo
 Bulk liquids
 Bulk mail
 Bulk material handling
 Bulk pack, packaged bulk materials/products
 Bulk purchasing

Baking
 Bulk fermentation, the period after mixing when dough is left alone to ferment in bulk, meaning before division to final weights.

Physics 
Bulk density
Bulk modulus
In brane cosmology and M-theory (see also the AdS/CFT correspondence), the bulk is a hypothetical higher-dimensional space within which the eleven dimensions of our universe (the three dimensions we can see, plus time, plus the seven extra dimensions that we can't see but M-theory theorizes are all around us) may exist.

People 
Mike Waters, known as Bulk, British professional wrestler with the UK Pitbulls

Fiction 
Bulk and Skull, a pair of characters in the Power Rangers universe

Places
Bulk, Lancashire, area of Lancaster, England
Bülk Lighthouse, outside Kiel, Germany